Kraków is an electoral district in Poland for elections to the Sejm, to which it elects eight members to the Sejm.

It is located in the south of the country, centred on the city of Chrzanów, on the south-eastern outskirts of the Metropolitan Association of Upper Silesia and the south-western outskirts of Kraków: respectively the largest and third-largest metropolitan areas in Poland.  It covers five counties in the east of the Lesser Poland Voivodeship: Chrzanów, Myślenice, Oświęcim, Sucha, and Wadowice.

List of members

2019-2023

Footnotes

Electoral districts of Poland